SBS 2 was a geostationary communications satellite designed and manufactured by Hughes (now Boeing) on the HS-376 platform. It was ordered by Satellite Business Systems, which later sold it to Hughes Communications. It had a Ku band payload and operated on the 117°W longitude.

Satellite description 
The spacecraft was designed and manufactured by Hughes on the HS-376 satellite bus.

History 

On September 24, 1981, SDS 2 was finally launched by a Delta-3910 PAM-D from Cape Canaveral at 23:09 UTC.

In April 1996, SDS 2 finally decommissioned and put on a graveyard orbit.

References

See also 

 1981 in spaceflight

Communications satellites
1981 in spaceflight
Satellites using the HS-376 bus